Charles Lewis Greenwood (1891–1969) was a Pentecostal Christian pastor in the Assemblies of God. He is credited for the revival and church that was integral to the formation of the Assemblies of God in Australia.

Richmond Temple and the Sunshine Revival

In 1916, Charles Greenwood began holding prayer meetings in his home in Sunshine, Melbourne. Greenwood established the Sunshine Gospel Hall in 1925, and during a two-week campaign with evangelist A. C. Valdez, revival broke out. Over 200 people attended these meetings. Later that year Greenwood moved the church to the Richmond Theatre, (343 Bridge Road) changing its name to Richmond Temple.

Assemblies of God in Australia

After the Sunshine Revival of February 1926, other Pentecostal assemblies sought affiliation and Richmond Temple became the mother church of a network of Pentecostal churches which became the Pentecostal Church of Australia. In 1937, Greenwood met with the leaders of the Assemblies of God Queensland to unite and form a single denomination. The Assemblies of God in Australia was established and Greenwood became the Chairman.

External links
 Description of the Sunshine Revival
 Founding of Richmond Temple

(Note that Greenwood served two non-consecutive terms as Chairman.)

Australian Christian Churches people
Evangelists
1969 deaths
1891 births
People from Sunshine, Victoria
Religious leaders from Melbourne